Guangping County ( is a county of southern Hebei province, China.

Administrative divisions
There are 3 towns and 4 townships under the county's administration.

Towns:
Guangping, Pinggudian, Shengying

Townships:
Dongzhangmeng Township, Shilipu Township, Nanyangbao Township, Nanhancun Township

Climate

References

County-level divisions of Hebei
Handan